Tivoli Concert Hall is a 1,660-capacity concert hall at Tivoli Gardens in Copenhagen, Denmark. The building, which was designed by Frits Schlegel and Hans Hansen, was built between 1954 and 1956. The concert hall is used for classical music (e.g. Tivoli Symphony Orchestra), Broadway musicals, and jazz musicians.

History
The hall used to host pop and rock concerts. Notable artists that have performed at the venue include The Grateful Dead, Country Joe and the Fish, Ike & Tina Turner, Elton John, Procol Harum, Saga, Uriah Heep, Cream, Jerry Lee Lewis, Jethro Tull and Norah Jones. Today it is mostly used for classical, acoustic, and jazz music. The Eurovision Song Contest 1964 was broadcast from the auditorium.

The first concert hall
The first concert hall in Tivoli Gardens opened in 1843. It was expanded in 1873 and is the building now known as the Glass Hall. Hans Christian Lumbye was music director and chief conductor from 1843 until 1872. He wrote almost 700 compositions for the orchestra, especially polkas, valses and galops.

The 1902 concert hall
 
A new concert hall was built in "Moorish style" in 1902. The building was designed by Knud Arne Petersen and Richard Bergmann.

The current building

The concert hall was destroyed when Tivoli Gardens was hit by schalburgtage on the night between 24 and 25 June 1944. The concert hall was rebuilt to a new, Modernist design by Frits Schlegel and Hans Hansen.

In 2005 the concert hall saw a major renovation and extension by 3XN where the classical 1950s style of the main auditorium—including a characteristic color scheme of red, blue, yellow and green—was restored, while visitor facilities were upgraded and expanded.

Use

Classical music
Until 2009, the Orchestra was based in the Tivoli Concert Hall. Since then the Copenhagen Philharmonic has been based at the former Danmarks Radio concert hall, which is now the concert hall of the Royal Danish Academy of Music. During the summer season, while the Tivoli Gardens are open, the orchestra continues to perform in the Tivoli Concert Hall under the name Tivoli Symphony Orchestra.

Musicals

 2010–11: Elsk mig i nat
 2010–11: Mamma Mia!
 2012: Grease
 2014: Grease
 2014: Hodja Fra Pjort
 2015: Dirty Dancing
 2016: Hairspray
 2017. Spamalot
 2017: Elf
 2018: Kærlighed ved første hik - the musical

Jazz music
On several occasions, jazz recording artists performed at the venue.

See also
 Tivoli Gardens
 List of concert halls in Denmark

References

External links

 

Concert halls in Copenhagen
Buildings and structures completed in 1956
Modernist architecture in Copenhagen